Stephen Emery was an American subway dispatcher and political activist from New York. He was twice the vice-presidential nominee of the Socialist Labor Party of America in 1948 and 1952. Running alongside Edward A. Teichert in 1948, the SLP ticket received 29,244 votes in 22 states. Four years later in 1952, Emery was nominated alongside Eric Hass. Hass/Emery received 30,406 votes.

In April 1970, Emery was nominated to be the SLP's candidate for Governor of New York. At the time of nomination, he lived in Jamaica, Queens, New York City. He won 3,963 votes to finish in last place among six candidates.

Published works
 Stephen Emery, member of the Socialist Labor Party of America Letter to Albert Einstein The Weekly People, 1949

References

Year of birth missing
Year of death missing
People from Queens, New York
Socialist Labor Party of America politicians from New York (state)
1948 United States vice-presidential candidates
1952 United States vice-presidential candidates
Socialist Labor Party of America vice presidential nominees
Politicians from New York City